The Homeless Emergency Action Team (HEAT) was announced on December 9, 2008 by Vancouver Mayor Gregor Robertson to assist Vancouver’s homeless citizens during an extremely cold winter. It created the controversial HEAT Shelters.

Composition
The team was chaired by Mayor Gregor Robertson, and was composed of elected officials and housing stakeholders.

Elected members
The three publicly elected members of the team were:
 Mayor Gregor Robertson (Chair)
 Kerry Jang, Vancouver City Councillor (Council Liaison)
 Raymond Louie, Vancouver City Councillor

Non-elected members
The non-elected members were:
 Janice Abbott – Executive Director, Atira Women's Resource Society
 Jim Chu – Chief, Vancouver Police Department
 Dr. Patricia Daly - Chief Medical Officer, Vancouver Coastal Health Authority
 David Eby – Executive Director, BC Civil Liberties Association
 Michael Flanigan – Director of Real Estate Services, City of Vancouver
 Judy Graves – Outreach Coordinator, Housing Department, City of Vancouver
 Cameron Gray, Managing Director, Department of Social Development, City of Vancouver
 John MacKay – Strand Development Corporation, Board member of StreetoHome Foundation
 Shayne Ramsay, CEO, BC Housing
 Patrick Stewart, Chair, Aboriginal Homelessness Steering Committee

References 

Politics of Vancouver
Homelessness in Canada